Mountjoy Blount, 1st Earl of Newport,  to 12 February 1666, was an English courtier and politician, who held a number of positions under Charles I of England and supported the Royalists in the First English Civil War.

Personal details
Mountjoy Blount was born circa 1597, one of four children born to Charles Blount, 8th Baron Mountjoy (1563-1606) and his partner Penelope Rich, Lady Rich (1563-1607). His mother was married to Robert Rich, 1st Earl of Warwick; they separated shortly before Mountjoy was born, although they did not get divorced until 1605. Penelope was a sister of the Earl of Essex, executed for treason in 1601, making Blount a cousin to future Parliamentarian general Robert Devereux, 3rd Earl of Essex. 

This made Blount half-brother to Robert Rich, 2nd Earl of Warwick (1587–1658) and Henry Rich, 1st Earl of Holland (1590-1649). He also had three full brothers and sisters, Penelope (1592-?), Isabella, and Charles (1605-1627); almost certainly fathered by Charles Mountjoy, these children were brought up within the Rich family and appear in its pedigree, with the exception of Mountjoy, who was legitimised after his father's death.

On 7 February 1627, he married Anne Boteler, a niece of George Villiers, 1st Duke of Buckingham, a close friend and favourite of Charles I. They had five children who survived into adulthood; Isabella (1630-1655), Anne (1637-1651?), Mountjoy Blount, 2nd Earl of Newport (1630-1675), Thomas Blount, 3rd Earl of Newport (1637-1675) and Henry Blount, 4th Earl of Newport (1640-1679). All three of his sons died without children, allegedly because they were mentally disabled.

Career

He became a member of James I's court, where he was something of a royal favourite, who played in a masque before the king mounted by James Hay, 1st Earl of Carlisle at Essex House on 8 January 1620/1621. He was part of the entourage that accompanied Carlisle on a diplomatic mission to Louis XIII after the passage of Prince Charles through Paris incognito on his way to Spain at the time of negotiations towards the ill-starred "Spanish Match".

Earl of Newport
In July 1627, he was created Earl of Newport in the Isle of Wight; Newport, as he now was, took part in the Siege of Saint-Martin-de-Ré in 1627 but was captured at the Battle of Pont du Feneau on 8 November. He was however released soon after. He held a rear-admiral's command in the ineffective expedition to relieve La Rochelle in August 1628, for which he was petitioning for payment in the following years. His appointment as Master of Ordnance for his lifetime was granted on 31 August 1634; as was expected in the seventeenth century, he derived a tidy fortune from the position. From his sale of gunpowder at exorbitant prices, through the Spanish ambassador, to supply the Spanish fleet attacking Dutch forces in September 1639, he pocketed £1000, and the King, £5000.

By his own account, he bargained with the ambassador to land soldiers from the Spanish fleet at Dunkirk, at thirty shillings a head, though public neutrality had been enjoined by Charles. His relatives, the Rich-Devereux clan, were identified with the Parliamentary opposition in the 1630s. Although at Christmas 1639, Newport participated with the King in the extravagant masque on the theme of Philogenes, royal "lover of the People", with the return of the Long Parliament the next year, Newport by degrees joined the forces of opposition in the House of Lords. 

The turning point came during the trial of Strafford in 1641, when Col. Lord Goring had revealed to Newport an amateurish plot of Royalist officers at Portsmouth to take London by surprise, seize the Tower and somehow rescue the king. Goring betrayed the plot to Newport, who passed on the information to John Pym, who brought it forward at the most dramatic and opportune moment, sealing Strafford's fate in the bill of attainder.

When the First English Civil War began in August 1642, Newport served in the Royalist army, and took part in the second battle of Newbury in 1644. In January 1646 he was taken prisoner and confined in London on parole. He played little part in public affairs thereafter. After the Restoration of Charles II in 1660, he regained some of his old influence, but age and ill health were taking their toll.

On 12 February 1666, he died at St Aldate's, Oxford where he had gone to avoid the Great Plague of London, and was buried in Christ Church, Oxford.

References

Sources
  s.v. "Mountjoy Blount"
 
 
 
 
 
 

1597 births
1666 deaths
Mountjoy
Place of birth missing
Earls of Newport
Peers of Ireland created by James I
Peers of England created by Charles I
Royalist military personnel of the English Civil War
Military personnel from London
Burials at Christ Church Cathedral, Oxford